The 2018 NCAA Division II football rankings are from the American Football Coaches Association (AFCA). This is for the 2018 season.

Legend

American Football Coaches Association poll

References

Rankings
NCAA Division II football rankings